Pleased to Meet Me is the fifth studio album by the American rock band The Replacements, released in 1987 by Sire Records. The album was acclaimed by music critics.

Background and recording 

Pleased to Meet Me is the only album recorded by the band as a trio. After their previous album Tim, guitarist Bob Stinson was no longer with the band. Stinson was still a member when the album's demos were recorded in August 1986; however, he only showed up for one recording session.

The main recording sessions for the album took place at Ardent Studios in Memphis between November 1986 and January 1987, under the supervision of producer Jim Dickinson.

Guitarist Bob "Slim" Dunlap joined the band soon after the recording sessions.

Music and lyrics 
While the punk roots of the group were still apparent on Tim, by Pleased to Meet Me they were there more in spirit as the band delved into other genres, such as soul and cocktail jazz, alongside tracks featuring their customary hard rocking sound. Perhaps due to the album's recording in soul music center Memphis, Tennessee, or the influence of producer Jim Dickinson, the band augmented its sound with saxophone on the tracks "I Don't Know" and "Nightclub Jitters" and a horn section on "Can't Hardly Wait", which features Big Star vocalist Alex Chilton on guitar.

A music video was made for "The Ledge", but it was banned from airplay on MTV due to its lyrical content about suicide.

Artwork and release 
The album's cover art mocks the band's transition from young punks to successful musicians with a major record deal, depicting a handshake between one person clad in a suit, starched white shirt, glitzy watch and diamond ring and the other wearing a ripped workshirt. Westerberg was the man in the ripped shirt, but his face was not shown in the shot used on the cover. The self-mocking tone continues on the song, "I Don't Know", with its chorus, "One foot in the door/The other one in the gutter."

The artwork  is also an homage to the cover art of Elvis Presley’s 1960 soundtrack album G.I. Blues, from the film of the same name.

Pleased to Meet Me was released in 1987 by Sire Records and peaked at #131 on the Billboard Music Chart's Top 200. According to Our Band Could Be Your Life author Michael Azerrad, the album sold "about 300,000 copies."

On September 23, 2008, Pleased to Meet Me was remastered and reissued by Rhino Entertainment with 11 additional tracks consisting of studio demos, B-sides, and alternate takes. New liner notes were written by Peter Jesperson.

In 2020, Rhino Entertainment released a deluxe edition that contained 3 CDs and 1 LP.

Critical reception 

Pleased to Meet Me was acclaimed by music critics. Writing for Rolling Stone, David Fricke described it as "an album alive with the crackle of conflicting emotions and kamikaze rock & roll fire." In a retrospective review, Stephen Thomas Erlewine of AllMusic felt that Pleased to Meet Me "was the last time [The Replacements] could still shoot for the stars and seem like their scrappy selves and, in many ways, it was the last true Replacements album". The album appeared at number three in The Village Voices Pazz & Jop critics' poll for 1987. In 2012, Paste placed the record at number 70 on its list of "The 80 Best Albums of the 1980s".

Track listing

2020 Deluxe Edition

Personnel 
 Paul Westerberg – lead and background vocals, electric and acoustic guitars, piano (on "Nightclub Jitters"), six-string bass (on "Skyway", "Can't Hardly Wait"), harmonica (on "Can't Hardly Wait")
 Tommy Stinson – bass guitar (except "Skyway"), background vocals, upright bass (on "Nightclub Jitters"), acoustic guitar and guitar fills (on "Can't Hardly Wait")
 Chris Mars – drums, background vocals, cowbell (on "Alex Chilton"), foot tap (on "Skyway")
 Jim Dickinson (credited as East Memphis Slim) – keyboards (on "I.O.U.", "The Ledge", "Can't Hardly Wait"), background vocals (on "I.O.U."), organ (on "Valentine"), vibes (on "Skyway")
 James "Vito" Lancaster – background vocals (on "I.O.U.", "Alex Chilton", "Shooting Dirty Pool")
 Teenage Steve Douglas – baritone sax (on "I Don't Know"), bass flute (on "The Ledge")
 Prince Gabe – saxophone (on "Nightclub Jitters")
 Luther Dickinson – guitar solo (on "Shooting Dirty Pool")
 Alex Chilton – guitar fills (on "Can't Hardly Wait")
 Max Huls – strings (on "Can't Hardly Wait")
 The Memphis Horns (on "Can't Hardly Wait"):
 Andrew Love – tenor sax
 Ben Cauley (credited as Ben Jr.) – trumpet
 John Hampton – engineer, mixing
 Joe Hardy – engineer, mixing
 Ted Jensen – mastering
 James Lancaster – production Assistant, inner sleeve photography
 Daniel Corrigan – cover and inner sleeve photography
 Glenn Parsons – design

References

External links 

The Replacements (band) albums
1987 albums
Sire Records albums
Albums produced by Jim Dickinson